Pollenia viatica is a species of cluster fly in the family Polleniidae.

Distribution
Armenia, Belgium, Bulgaria, Croatia, Czech Republic, Denmark, France, Germany, Great Britain, Greece, Hungary, Iran, Israel, Italy, Jordan, Kazakhstan, Kyrgyzstan, Lebanon, Malta, Moldova, Netherlands, Poland, Romania, Slovakia, Sweden, Syria, Turkey, Ukraine, Uzbekistan, West Bank, Yugoslavia.

References

Polleniidae
Insects described in 1830
Diptera of Europe
Diptera of Africa
Taxa named by Jean-Baptiste Robineau-Desvoidy